Wonderfool may refer to:
Wonderfool, an album by Dilana Smith
Wonderfool, a 1990s band formed by Ira Katz, previously with The Greenberry Woods.
The Wonderfools, a band from Norway